Arthur Herbert Lindsay Richardson VC (23 September 1872 – 15 December 1932) was an England-born Canadian recipient of the Victoria Cross, the highest and most prestigious award for gallantry in the face of the enemy that can be awarded to British and Commonwealth forces.

Details
Born in Southport, Lancashire, in 1872, Richardson emigrated to Canada in 1891.  After a period as a rancher, he joined the North-West Mounted Police in 1894.  After the outbreak of the Second Boer War, in 1900 he joined the newly raised Strathcona's Horse.

Richardson was 27 years old and a sergeant when the deed, for which he was awarded the VC, took place. The VC was announced in the London Gazette on 14 September 1900, four months before the death of Queen Victoria. The medal was presented to him by King Edward VII at the first presentation of VCs after the King ascended the throne. Richardson was the third of three VCs presented with their medals on 12 March 1901 at St James' Palace. 

The commander of his unit, Lieutenant Agar Adamson, reported:

Richardson was the first member of a Canadian unit awarded the Victoria Cross. 

He re-joined the NWMP in 1902 and served until ill health forced him to retire in 1907. After his wife's death in 1916, Richardson returned to Liverpool and died there in 1932.

The medal
His Victoria Cross is displayed at Canadian War Museum in Ottawa, Ontario. His gravestone can be seen at the Liverpool Cathedral St. James Gardens.

See also
 List of Canadian Victoria Cross recipients

References

Monuments to Courage (David Harvey, 1999)
The Register of the Victoria Cross (This England, 1997)
Victoria Crosses of the Anglo-Boer War (Ian Uys, 2000)
Liverpool VCs (James Murphy, Pen and Sword Books, 2008)

External links
 Location of grave and VC medal (Liverpool)
 Canadian Defence article on Arthur Richardson
 St James Cemeterynit 
 
 Legion Magazine

1872 births
1932 deaths
British recipients of the Victoria Cross
Second Boer War recipients of the Victoria Cross
People from Southport
Royal Canadian Mounted Police officers
English emigrants to Canada
Canadian military personnel of the Second Boer War
Lord Strathcona's Horse soldiers
Lord Strathcona's Horse (Royal Canadians)